The Ajyad Fortress was an Ottoman citadel which stood on a hill overlooking the Grand Mosque of Mecca, in what is now Saudi Arabia. Built in the late 18th century, it was demolished by the Saudi government in 2002 for commercial development of the Abraj Al Bait, sparking outcry from Turkey and other concerned Muslims of the world.

History
The fortress was built in 1780 under Ottoman rule (later Hejaz vilayet) in order to protect the Kaaba in Mecca from Bedouin bandits and invaders. The Ottoman Empire ruled a vast empire covering the Arabian Peninsula, the Balkans, and North Africa. However, the empire disintegrated at the beginning of the 20th century and present-day Turkey was established as a secular state.

From 1 to 9 January 2002, the Ajyad Fortress was demolished and most of Bulbul mount was leveled, in order to clear the area for the $15 billion construction project.

Reactions

The destruction of the historic structure stirred both domestic and international protest. The Turkish Foreign Minister İsmail Cem İpekçi as well as several institutions tried to prevent the demolition. The Turkish Democratic Left Party (DSP) Deputy Ertuğrul Kumcuoğlu even suggested a boycott on travelling to Saudi Arabia. The Turkish Ministry of Culture and Tourism condemned the obliteration of the fortress, comparing the act to the destruction of the Buddhas of Bamyan, and accusing the Saudi authorities of "continuing with their policy of demolishing Ottoman heritage sites".

The French news agency Agence France-Presse (AFP) quoted Saudi Islamic affairs Minister Saleh al-Shaikh as saying "no-one has the right to interfere in what comes under the state's authority". In reference to the housing component of the plan, al-Sheikh added that it was intended to house pilgrims to Mecca, and said "this is in the interest of Muslims all over the world".

However, the destruction of this and other historic sites fueled criticism of the Saudis, and plans were made to rebuild the castle, as ordered by the King in 2001:

A  scale model of the fortress is included along with other architectural models at the Miniatürk miniature park in Istanbul, Turkey.

See also

 The Qishla of Mecca

References

Forts in Saudi Arabia
Ottoman fortifications
Buildings and structures in Mecca
Demolished buildings and structures in Saudi Arabia
Infrastructure completed in 1781
Buildings and structures demolished in 2002
Former castles
Castles in Saudi Arabia
Mecca
Ottoman Empire